Green alternative - Sustainable Development of Croatia or ORaH (Orah meaning "walnut" in Croatian) is a minor green political party in Croatia.

History
The party was formed in 2013. Its leader is a former Minister of Environmental Protection and Nature and Social Democratic Party MP Mirela Holy. She won the seat in the Sabor as a member of the Social Democratic Party which she left after some disagreements over party leadership.

In the May 2014, the party came close to 10% of the vote and elected one MEP, Davor Škrlec, who sits with the Greens in the European Parliament. Later that year, the minor green party Green List merged into ORaH.

On 23 July 2015 it was announced that an independent MP Mladen Novak was joining ORaH. He was a former Croatian Labourists – Labour Party member who left the party after it started negotiating to join Kukuriku coalition. Another former labourist MP, Zlatko Tušak, joined the party on 18 September 2015, giving ORaH a third MP ahead of the elections.

In the 2015 Croatian parliamentary election, ORaH fared worse than any opinion poll had predicted, gaining less than 2% of the vote, and no MP. It is the largest party outside of the Croatian Parliament.

In February 2016, Mirela Holy left the party "because of personal and professional reasons", stating that she wanted to have more time for lecturing on Vern Polytechnic, writing books and fashion design. In April 2016, Davor Škrlec left the party because of his dissatisfaction over how the party is run, and the party's passivity towards the problems of Croatian society.

At the assembly held on Sunday, November 15, the members of ORaH made a decision to supplement the name of the party, which is now called the Green Alternative - Sustainable Development of Croatia. The desire was in this way to further highlight their green party orientation.

Electoral results

Croatian Parliament

European Parliament

References

Political parties established in 2013
2013 establishments in Croatia
Green political parties in Croatia
Political parties in Croatia
Progressive parties
Pro-European political parties in Croatia